Eloise at the Plaza is a 2003 American made-for-television comedy film based on the Eloise series of children's books drawn and written by Kay Thompson and Hilary Knight. It stars young Sofia Vassilieva as Eloise, an irrepressible six-year-old girl who lives in the penthouse at the top of the Plaza Hotel in New York City.

This film was produced by Handmade Films and DiNovi Pictures for Walt Disney Television with distribution handled by the ABC Television Network, and released on both VHS and DVD by Buena Vista Home Entertainment in 2003.

Plot
Eloise (Sofia Vassilieva) is a fun-loving six-year-old girl with a knack for finding adventure every place she looks. While under the care of her "rawther" wonderful nanny (Julie Andrews), Eloise tries to play matchmaker to a lonely prince and wrangle an invitation to the society event of the season.

Cast

Reception
Alessandra Stanley from The New York Times, praised the film fidelity to the book and the actor's performances. Reel Film Reviews gave the film two out of four stars, stating: "Eloise at the Plaza is mildly entertaining, if only because it seems to consist of one caper after another. The film's structure soon becomes perfectly obvious - Eloise gets into a madcap adventure, adults chase her around, Nanny admonishes her, etc - and the fast pace is clearly in place to keep younger viewers interested. But, though there are a number of talented actors in the cast, Eloise just isn't a compelling enough character to sustain an entire movie. There's no doubt that the movie will act as wish fulfillment for kids - who wouldn't want to run amuck and get away with it? - but when you get right down to it, Eloise is awfully thin and one-dimensional (not to mention annoying)." DVDizzy.com wrote: "The film even ascends beyond the second-tier quality that most television movies are satisfied to achieve. Eloise deserves praise not merely as a more bearable Wonderful World of Disney presentation, but as a genuinely entertaining family film, regardless of format."

For his work in "Eloise at the Plaza", Bruce Broughton won one Primetime Emmy Award in the category of "Outstanding Music Composition for a Miniseries, Movie or a Special (Dramatic Underscore)".

On Rotten Tomatoes, "Eloise at the Plaza" currently holds 68% of audience approbation.

References

External links
 
 Official Eloise Website
 
 ABC Press Release of Eloise at the Plaza

2003 television films
2003 films
American children's comedy films
Disney direct-to-video films
Films based on children's books
Films set in the 1950s
Films set in hotels
Films directed by Kevin Lima
Self-reflexive films
Films scored by Bruce Broughton
2000s English-language films
2000s American films